Yeti Cycles is an American bicycle manufacturer located in Golden, Colorado.

Early history
Yeti Cycles was founded in 1985 by John Parker in California, when mountain biking was gaining in popularity. Parker was a welder who built movie sets in Hollywood and later became a mountain bike designer and racer. Becoming one of the sport’s guardians, he was inducted into the Mountain Bike Hall of Fame in 1997, and a trustee of NORBA Board of Directors for five years.

The first mountain bike World Championships took place in Durango, Colorado in 1990 and the next year Parker moved the Yeti Cycles factory from California to Durango to be closer to the action. The company made a range of mountain bikes, but were best known at the time for their iconic turquoise colored FRO (For Racing Only) models.

Early sponsored riders included John Tomac, and Juli Furtado.

In 1995, Schwinn bought Yeti Cycles company and later sold it to ski company Volant in 1999 (now part of Amer Sports).

Revival

In 2001, two Yeti employees, Steve Hoogendoorn and Chris Conroy, bought the company. Conroy is currently the president and Hoogendoorn the vice president of Yeti Cycles. The company headquarters is now located in Golden, Colorado.

Yeti Cycles competed in downhill mountain bike racing with the successful Lawwill DH-9 full-suspension downhill bike, developed by former motorcycle champion, Mert Lawwill. Yeti has a patented suspension system that they call ZeroLoss Technology or linear guide technology. The suspension system consists of two gliding pivots. The wheel path follows the direction of the impact so it transfers directly into the mountain bike suspension system and goes into the shock rather than flexing the frame.

More recently, Yeti has patented a new suspension design called Switch Technology, which is basically a dual-link design that utilizes an eccentric mechanism that switches direction as the bike moves through its travel. This type of suspension is found on their 2012-2014 era mountain bikes, the SB-66, SB-75 and the SB-95.

In 2014, Yeti introduced a refinement to the Switch Technology, dubbed Switch Infinity. This patented design was developed along with Fox Racing Shox and involves a 'translating pivot' which is said to improve the bike's rearward axle path. This rear suspension design change has been used on Yeti dual-suspension models, including the SB5, SB4.5, SB6, SB5.5, SB100, SB115, SB130, SB140, SB150 SB160, SB160e and SB165.

Women specific bikes were introduced in 2015. Yeti Beti caters to women with smaller sized frames and lower standover height. These models have since been discontinued after the 2019 season.

Current Yeti/FOX Factory riders include Richie Rude, Bex Baraona, and Slawek Lukasik. Yeti is also represented by a number of athletes and ambassadors throughout the world.

References

External links
 

Vehicle manufacturing companies established in 1985
Cycle manufacturers of the United States
1985 establishments in Colorado
Mountain bike manufacturers